Tadamasa (written: 忠政 , 忠正, 忠雅, 忠昌, 忠方, 忠誠 or 内政) is a masculine Japanese given name. Notable people with the name include:

, Japanese yakuza boss
, Japanese art dealer
, Japanese daimyō
, Japanese nobleman
, Japanese rower
, Japanese politician
, Japanese daimyō
, Japanese daimyō
, Japanese samurai
, Japanese daimyō
, Japanese daimyō
, Japanese sprint canoeist
, Japanese daimyō
, Japanese daimyō
, Japanese daimyō

Japanese masculine given names